Catharina Cornelia Adriana Maria "Carry" van Gool-Floris (born 19 September 1953) is a Dutch former archer and archery coach.

Career 

Gool-Floris competed in the 1980 and 1984 Summer Olympic Games for the Netherlands. She finished sixth and 23rd in the women's individual event.

References

External links 

 Profile on worldarchery.org

1953 births
Living people
Dutch female archers
Olympic archers of the Netherlands
People from Goirle
Sportspeople from North Brabant
Archers at the 1980 Summer Olympics
Archers at the 1984 Summer Olympics
20th-century Dutch women